Chris David (born 14 June 1953) is an English sound engineer. He was nominated for an Academy Award in the category Best Sound for the film Legends of the Fall. He has worked on 170-plus films since 1982.

Selected filmography
 Legends of the Fall (1994)

References

External links

1953 births
Living people
English audio engineers
Film people from London